Rameshk (also Romanized as Remeshk; also known as Rāmīshk) is a village in Rameshk Rural District, Chah Dadkhoda District, Qaleh Ganj County, Kerman Province, Iran. At the 2006 census, its population was 2,874, in 510 families.

References 

Populated places in Qaleh Ganj County